The Mawé language of Brazil, also known as Sateré (Mabue, Maragua, Andira, Arapium), is one of the Tupian languages. It is spoken by 7,000 people, many of them monolingual.

Phonology

Consonants

Vowels

References

External links 
 
 Mateus 1, Tupana Ehay Satere Mawe Pusupuo (MAVNT) The New Testament in Sataré-Mawé

 Example of publications in Sataré-Mawé

Tupian languages